Pécsvárad is a district in north-eastern part of Baranya County, Hungary. Pécsvárad is also the name of the town where the district seat is found. The district is located in the Southern Transdanubia Statistical Region.

Geography 
Pécsvárad District borders with Bonyhád District (Tolna County) to the north, Mohács District to the east, the Bóly District to the south, Pécs District to the west. The number of the inhabited places in Pécsvárad District is 17.

Municipalities 
The district has 1 town and 16 villages.
(ordered by population, as of 1 January 2012)

The bolded municipality is city.

See also
List of cities and towns in Hungary

References

External links
 Postal codes of the Pécsvárad District

Districts in Baranya County